The orange-breasted fruiteater (Pipreola jucunda) is a species of bird in the family Cotingidae native to Colombia and Ecuador. Its natural habitat is subtropical or tropical moist montane forests. Males have a glossy black head and bib, an orange throat and yellow belly. Females lack the dark head and have green upper parts and green and yellow streaked underparts. Both sexes have orange beaks and greyish-green legs. This is a relatively common species with a wide range, and the International Union for Conservation of Nature has rated its conservation status as being of "least concern".

Description
The male orange-breasted fruiteater has a glossy black head and throat and green upper parts. The breast is bright orange and the belly yellow with green mottling at the side. The female is similar in appearance to the female masked fruiteater with green upper parts and green and yellow streaked underparts. Both sexes have yellow eyes, orange bill and greyish-green legs. The song is similar to that of the black-chested fruiteater, a high-pitched ascending "pseeeeeweet".

Distribution and habitat
This species is native to the foothills and slopes of the western side of the Andes in South America. This fruiteater is usually found in the understorey of dense, wet, mossy forests.

Ecology
The orange-breasted fruiteater is sometimes seen in small flocks with other species. It feeds largely on fruit which it either eats while perching on a branch or while hovering rather clumsily.

Status
The International Union for Conservation of Nature rates the orange-breasted fruiteater as being of "least concern", on the grounds that the bird has a reasonably-large range and is fairly common within that range, and its population seems to be steady.

References

orange-breasted fruiteater
Birds of the Colombian Andes
Birds of the Ecuadorian Andes
orange-breasted fruiteater
orange-breasted fruiteater
Taxonomy articles created by Polbot